The Donnell Ranch Garden is considered one of the masterpieces of modern landscape design, and one of the first examples of the now-ubiquitous kidney shaped pool. It was constructed in 1948 at the Donnell Ranch in Sonoma, California, by landscape architect Thomas Church.

References

Landscape gardens
Gardens in California
Buildings and structures in Sonoma, California